Charles-Simon Catel (10 June 1773 – 29 November 1830) was a French composer and educator born at L'Aigle, Orne.

Biography
Catel studied at the Royal School of Singing in Paris. He was the chief assistant to François-Joseph Gossec at the orchestra of the National Guard in 1790. A member of the Institute, he jointly composed pieces of military music for official state ceremonies, including L'Hymne à la Victoire (Victory Hymn), with words by Ponce-Denis Écouchard-Lebrun. He was appointed inaugural professor of harmony at the Conservatoire de Paris, but was destitute in 1814. Amongst his students were the Prix de Rome winning composers Joseph Daussoigne-Méhul and Victor Dourlen, the Belgian composer Martin-Joseph Mengal, and the famous, if eccentric, harpist Nicolas-Charles Bochsa. Catel died in Paris.

His works include a Treatise on Harmony (1802), which was used by the young Berlioz, several concert band works, several dramatic compositions at the Opéra National de Paris: Sémiramis, Les bayadères; at the Opéra-Comique: Artistes par occasion, L'Auberge de Bagnères (1807); Wallace (1817); symphonies, quartets etc.

Works

Lyrical works
 Sémiramis, lyric tragedy in three acts, libretto by Philippe Desriaux based on Voltaire, performed by the Opéra de Paris on 4 May 1802.
 Les artistes par occasion, farcical opera in one act, libretto by Alexandre Duval, performed at the Opéra-Comique in 1807.
 L'auberge de Bagnères, farcical opera in 3 acts, libretto by C. Jalabert, performed by the Opéra-Comique in 1807.
 Les bayadères, opera in 3 acts, libretto by Victor-Joseph-Étienne de Jouy based on Voltaire, performed at Opéra de Paris on 8 August 1810.
 Les aubergistes de qualité, comedy in 3 acts, libretto by Victor-Joseph-Étienne de Jouy, performed at Opéra-Comique on 17 June 1812
 Bayard à Mézières, comedy in one act, libretto by Alisvan de Chazet and Louis Emmanuel Mercier Dupaty, performed at Opéra-Comique in 1814.
 Le premier en date, comedy in one act, libretto by Marc-Antoine Désaugiers and Pessey, performed at Opéra-Comique in 1814.
 Wallace ou Le ménestrel écossais, epic opera in 3 acts, libretto by L. Ch. J. Fontanes de Saint-Marcellin, performed at Opéra-Comique in 1817.
 Zirphile et fleur de myrte ou cent ans en un jour, "opéra-féerie" in 2 acts, libretto by Victor-Joseph-Étienne de Jouy and Nicolas Lefebvre, performed at Opéra de Paris in 1818.
 L'officier enlevé, comedy in one act, libretto by Alexandre Duval, performed at Opéra-Comique in 1819.

Vocal and choral works
 Chant triomphal, 1807.
 Ode sur le Vaisseau Le Vengeur, words by Ponce-Denis Écouchard-Lebrun, for euphonium and orchestra.
 Hymne sur la reconquête de Toulon, for male choir and orchestra.

Sources
Bouillet's Dictionnaire d'histoire et de géographie (1842),

Burials at Père Lachaise Cemetery
Academic staff of the Conservatoire de Paris
French male classical composers
French opera composers
1773 births
1830 deaths
French male non-fiction writers
French music theorists
Male opera composers
Military music composers
People from Orne